The IHF Men's Handball World Championship has been organized indoor by the International Handball Federation since 1938. 

In the twenty-eight tournaments held, twelve national teams have won the title. France is the most successful team with six titles, followed by Sweden and Romania with four titles each.

The current champion is Denmark, which won its third consecutive title at the 2023 tournament in Poland and Sweden.

History
The first indoor championship took place in Germany in 1938, involving four teams from Europe made up of 7 players who competed in a round robin stage to find a winner. It wouldn't be until sixteen years later where the second World Championship was held in the country of Sweden. Throughout their history, the World Championships have been dominated by European teams, with no medals being won by non-European countries until 2015, by Qatar. Over the years, the organization of the World Championships has changed. Initially, there were group games in both the preliminary and main rounds, but since the 1995 edition a knockout system has been applied after the preliminary round.

Tournaments

Medal table

Participating nations

Statistics

List of hosts
List of hosts by number of championships hosted.

All-time table for champions (1938–2023)

Draws include knockout matches decided in a penalty shootout.

Most successful players
Boldface denotes active handball players and highest medal count among all players (including these who not included in these tables) per type.

Multiple gold medalists

* Including one medal won at the 1959 World Outdoor Field Handball Championship

Multiple medalists
The table shows players who have won at least 6 medals in total at the World Championships.

Top scorers by tournament
The record-holder for scored goals in a single World Championship is Kiril Lazarov. He scored 92 goals for Macedonia in nine matches at the 2009 World Championship.

See also
IHF World Women's Handball Championship
IHF World Men's Outdoor Handball Championship

Notes

References

IHF official website – Competition History
IHF official website – Men's World Championships
IHF official website – Men's World Championships – Statistics (1938–2009)
All time statistics with link to all results and all medal winners
All time medal winners

Recurring sporting events established in 1938
 
Men's
World